Simunovic may refer to:

 Simunović, a Serbian surname
 Šimunović, a Croatian surname